Reál Sangria is a fruity Spanish sangria produced from Spanish red wine and a blend of natural citrus fruit flavours. It is predominantly made from the Tempranillo and Garancha varieties, which are grown in La Mancha, Valencia, Alicante, and Rioja regions of Spain.

Réal Sangria is imported by Shaw-Ross, an importer of wine and spirit brands into the United States market.

Products 

Reál Sangria is sold in a variety of different sizes. The red 4-pack carries 4 individual bottles of  each. There is also a  bottle and a box, which holds  of the drink. Each bottle contains 7–10% of alcohol by volume.

Reál Sangria is introducing a new white sangria in America in 2010. Currently, the product is quite popular in Europe, and especially in Greece.

In March 2013, Reál Sangria broke the Guinness World Record for the largest sangria in Calle Ocho Festival in Miami, Florida.

Distribution 

Reál Sangria is the number one imported sangria from Spain in the United States. The best selling European area of the drink is in Greece. It is sold in chain stores such as Publix, Wal-Mart, Trader Joe's and Albertsons in certain states around the country. These states include Alaska, California, Florida, Georgia, Idaho, Illinois, Indiana, Kentucky, Michigan, Montana, North Carolina, Ohio, Oregon, Tennessee, Virginia, Washington

References 

Spanish wine